Roberto Ranieri (born 28 April 1997) is an Italian footballer who plays as a midfielder for  club Novara.

Career

Atalanta 
Born in Treviglio, Ranieri was a youth exponent of Atalanta.

Loan to Cosenza 
On 14 July 2016, Ranieri was signed by Serie C side Cosenza on a season-long loan deal. On 31 July he made his debut for Cosenza in a 1–0 home win over Nerostellati Frattese in the first round of Coppa Italia, he was replaced by Andrea Bilotta in the 87th minute. On 14 September he made his Serie C debut for Cosenza as a substitute replacing Giorgio Capece in the 63rd minute of a 3–0 home win over Melfi. On 18 September, Ranieri played his first match in Serie C as a starter, a 2–0 home win over Vibonese, he was replaced by Giorgio Capece in the 55th minute. On 16 October he played his first entire match for Cosenza, a 2–1 home win over Paganese. Ranieri ended his season-long loan to Cosenza with 36 appearances and 4 assists.

Loan to Alessandria 
On 9 July 2017, Ranieri was loaned to Serie C club Alessandria on a season-long loan deal. On 6 August he made his debut for Alessandria as a substitute replacing Riccardo Cazzola in the 86th minute of a 2–1 away defeat against Salernitana in the second round of Coppa Italia. On 27 August he made his Serie C debut for Alessandria as a substitute replacing Riccardo Cazzola in the 77th minute of a 1–1 away draw against Pontedera. On 24 September, Ranieri played his first match as a starter for Alessandria in Serie C, a 0–0 away draw against Robur Siena, he was replaced by Alessandro Gazzi in the 72nd minute. On 1 October he played his first entire match for Alessandria, a 1–0 home defeat against Arezzo. Ranieri ended his loan to Alessandria with 23 appearances.

Loan to Teramo and Imolese 
On 23 July 2018, Ranieri was signed by Serie C club Teramo on a season-long loan deal. On 17 September he made his Serie C debut for the club in a 1–0 away defeat against Südtirol, he was replaced by Lorenzo De Grazia in the 65th minute. One week later, on 23 September he played his first entire match for Teramo, a 0–0 home draw against Sambenedettese. On 7 October, Ranieri scored his first professional goal in the 89th minute of a 3–1 away defeat against FeralpiSalò and one week later, on 13 October, he scored his second consecutive goal in the 9th minute of a 1–1 away draw against Rimini. In January 2019, Ranieri returned to Atalanta leaving Teramo with 15 appearances, 2 goals and 1 assist.

On 31 January 2019, Ranieri was loaned to Serie C side Imolese on a 6-month loan deal. On 23 February he made his debut for Imolese as a starter in a 2–0 home win over Vis Pesaro, he was replaced in the 54th minute by Saber Hraiech. Ranieri ended his 6-month loan with 12 appearances, including only 5 as a starter.

Renate 
On 7 August 2019, Ranieri joined to Serie C club Renate on an undisclosed fee and he signed a 1-year contract with an option for the second year. On 25 August he made his debut for the club as a starter in a 2–0 away win over Giana Erminio, he was replaced by Alessio Militari after 80 minutes. Four weeks later, on 22 September he played his first entire match for the club, a 2–0 home win over Olbia. He became Renate's first-choice early in the season.

Novara
On 8 july 2022, he moved to Serie C club Novara.

Career statistics

Club

References

External links
 

1997 births
Living people
People from Treviglio
Sportspeople from the Province of Bergamo
Footballers from Lombardy
Italian footballers
Association football midfielders
Serie C players
Atalanta B.C. players
Cosenza Calcio players
U.S. Alessandria Calcio 1912 players
S.S. Teramo Calcio players
Imolese Calcio 1919 players
A.C. Renate players
Novara F.C. players